Centro de Supercomputación de Galicia (CESGA) is a high performance computing center in Galicia (Spain). Its most important features are the supercomputer FinisTerrae and the "Superordenador Virtual Gallego".
Finisterrae is nowadays the third most powerful supercomputer in Spain, and it was initially ranked 100th according to the Top500 when installed in November 2007.
CESGA provides advanced computing services to the Galician Scientific Community, Galician Universities and to the Spanish National Research Council (Consejo Superior de Investigaciones Científicas - CSIC).

CESGA also runs i-math, a Grid computing project with an initiative to approach Grid technologies to mathematics researchers, and operates the i-math Portal, a Grid Portal based on P-GRADE Portal technology. (See also: Grid computing)

Most important functions 

 To promote and spread the use of technologies of high performance computing and advanced communications. One of this examples is GalNIX, a neutral point of Internet traffic interchange for Galicia. The aim of GalNIX is to facilitate the data interchange between the Internet Service Providers which operate inside the Galician region. Some of the companies included here are Jazztel, "R cable y telecomunicaciones", Retegal and Retevisión.
 To promote and spread the use of technologies related to the Information Society, including: electronic commerce, e-learning and geographical information systems.

Computer Systems 

The following table shows some of the systems installed in CESGA. Since some systems were installed around 10 years ago some information may be outdated.

Location 

CESGA is located in the University of Santiago de Compostela Campus at the following address:

Avenida de Vigo, s/n Campus Sur 15705 Santiago de Compostela A Coruña - Spain

 Tel: +34 981 56 98 10
 Fax: +34 981 59 46 16

References

External links 
CESGA
CESGA i-math Portal

Supercomputer sites
Research institutes in Galicia, Spain